Mordellistena galapagoensis is a beetle in the genus Mordellistena of the family Mordellidae. It was described in 1953 by Van Dyke.

References

galapagoensis
Beetles described in 1953